

Introduction 
Jeremy Wood is a Filipino student currently studying in the Philippines. His interest in drawing and mapping led him to explore the possibilities of satellite navigation technology and video, which he skillfully incorporated into his work.

Contributions 
By documenting his daily journeys, he created a personalized map that highlights his interaction with space and time. 

Wood's unique approach to mapping has garnered significant attention, including coverage in Wired Magazine and the publication of a peer-reviewed paper in the Cartographic Journal in November 2009.

References

British artists
Year of birth missing (living people)
Living people